Delhi–Varanasi High Speed Rail Corridor (Delhi–Varanasi HSR) is India's second High-speed rail project after the Mumbai-Ahmedabad High Speed Rail Corridor. The  HSR corridor will connect Varanasi to Delhi through 13 stations along with a 123 km long spur connecting Lucknow and Ayodhya.

Cost

Stations
Delhi-Varanasi high speed rail corridor will have 13 stations. Proposed stations are Delhi, Noida, Jewar Airport, Mathura, Agra, New Etawah, South Kannauj, Lucknow, Ayodhya, Raebareli, Prayagraj, New Bhadohi and Varanasi.

Project status

2017
December: A consortium of INECO, TYPSA and ICT had submitted the project feasibility project report of the proposed Delhi-Varanasi High Speed Rail Corridor.

2019
December: Ministry of railways had given the task to National High Speed Rail Corporation Ltd (NHSRCL) for preparing the detailed project report (DPR).

2020
February: NHSRCL had started floating tenders for various activities including design and survey of the project.

2021
January: LiDAR survey for Delhi Varanasi bullet train project was initiated.
August: Detailed Project Report (DPR) which was expected to be submitted by this month, was then announced to be submitted in the month of September. A new spur line linking Ayodhya was also proposed.
November: Indian Railways received the Detailed Project Report (DPR) from NHSRCL which included multiple studies on expected ridership, impact on surrounding villages, land requirement, social impact assessment and effect on the environment.

2022
July: NHSRCL had finalized the overall route and stations of the project.
August: The railway ministry rejected the reports that reported shelving of the project. The ministry in fact mentioned that it had no issues regarding the DPR of the project. It was earlier reported that to reduce costs of land acquisition, the project would run through National Highway 2 which had many curves that put the project in question. Since the train runs at 350 kmph, the alignment must be relatively straight with minimal degrees of curves.

See also

References

High-speed railway lines in India
Standard gauge railways in India
Rail transport in Delhi
Rail transport in Uttar Pradesh
Proposed railway lines in India
Modi administration initiatives
Transport in Varanasi
Transport in Delhi
India–Japan relations
2030 in rail transport